Lake Sauce also locally known as Laguna Azul (Spanish for "blue lake"), is a lake in Peru. It is located in the region of San Martin, 45 km from the city of Tarapoto, at 700 m of elevation and has an area of 4.3 km2. The lake is surrounded by hotels, camping facilities, forest remnants and agricultural land. The lake is a good spot for swimming and fishing.

References

External links 

Lakes of San Martín Region
Lakes of Peru